Another City, Another Sorry is the debut studio album by Manchester band The Answering Machine. It was released on 15 June 2009 in the United Kingdom on Heist or Hit Records.

Track listing

Personnel
Design - Sean Mort
Management - Amul Batra
Mastered by - Ed Woods
Performer - Ben Perry, Gemma Evans, Martin Colclough, Patrick Fogarty
Photography - Nicola Chipman
Photography [Band Shots] - Emily Dennison
Producer, mixed by, engineer - Dave Eringa
Producer, mixed by, assistant engineers - Donald Clark, Tom Loffman
Songwriters - The Answering Machine

Notes
Produced, mixed and engineered at Warren House Farm Studios and Beethoven Street Studios, London
Mastered at Black Dog Studios
Management at Fwinki Music

References

2009 debut albums